Senator Barrett may refer to:

Bill Barrett (1929–2016), Nebraska State Senate
Dan Barrett (politician) (fl. 2000s–2010s), North Carolina State Senate
Debby Barrett (fl. 2000s–2010s), Montana State Senate
Elisha T. Barrett (1902–1966), New York State Senate
Frank A. Barrett (1892–1962), U.S. Senator from Wyoming from 1953 to 1959
James Barrett (Vermont judge) (1814–1900), Vermont State Senate
John Barrett (Missouri politician) (1915–2000), Missouri State Senate
Michael J. Barrett (born 1948), Massachusetts State Senate
Tom Barrett (Michigan politician) (born 1981), Michigan State Senate
Tom Barrett (Wisconsin politician) (born 1953), Wisconsin State Senate
William N. Barrett (1855–1916), Oregon State Senate

See also
Elizabeth Barrett-Anderson (born 1953), Senate of Guam